Leucopogon compactus is a species of flowering plant in the heath family Ericaceae and is endemic to the south of Western Australia. It is an erect shrub with oblong leaves and dense clusters of white, tube-shaped flowers.

Description
The flowers are white and arranged in dense clusters on the ends of branches and in upper leaf axils. Flowering occurs from June to August or December.

Taxonomy
Leucopogon compactus was first formally described in 1859 by Sergei Sergeyevich Sheglejev in the Bulletin de la Société impériale des naturalistes de Moscou. The specific epithet (compactus) means "compact" or "united".

Distribution and habitat
This leucopogon grows on plains and hillslopes in the Esperance Plains bioregion of southern Western Australia.

Conservation status 
Leucopogon compactus is listed as "Priority Four" by the Government of Western Australia Department of Biodiversity, Conservation and Attractions, meaning that it is rare or near threatened.

References

compactus
Ericales of Australia
Flora of Western Australia
Plants described in 1859